Josep Vicent is a Spanish conductor. Principal Conductor - Music Director with ADDA Simfònica of Spain.
Artistic and General Director at ADDA Auditorium in the region of Valencia.
Conducta regularly Orchestras like Rotterdam Philharmonic, London Symphony, Belgium National Orchestra and many others. He was artistic director at Xenakis Festival and The Amsterdam Percussion Group. He has been also chief conductor and artistic director with Balearic Symphony Orchestra. He is the artistic director and principal conductor at The World Orchestra. Vicent was born in the musical region of Valencia in Spain and studied at the Conservatorio Superior de Música de Alicante and the Sweelinck Conservatorium in Amsterdam.

References

External links

1970 births
Living people
Spanish percussionists
Spanish conductors (music)
Male conductors (music)
Music directors
Conservatorium van Amsterdam alumni
21st-century conductors (music)
21st-century male musicians
Spanish male musicians

http://www.ibermusica-artists.es/es/artistas/29/josep-vicent